Dreamius Smith is a former American football running back. He was signed by the San Diego Chargers after going undrafted in the 2015 NFL Draft. He attended West Virginia University.

Smith has also played for the Pittsburgh Steelers.

Professional career

San Diego Chargers
After going undrafted in the 2015 NFL Draft, Smith signed with the San Diego Chargers on May 2, 2015. He was released as part of the final preseason cuts on September 5, 2015 and was signed to the Chargers' practice squad the following day. He was released from the practice squad on September 12, 2015.
He was re-signed to the practice squad on November 5, 2015. He was promoted to the active roster on December 22, 2015.

On August 30, 2016, Smith was placed on injured reserve. He was released by the Chargers two days later.

Pittsburgh Steelers
On November 28, 2016, Smith was signed to the Steelers' practice squad. He signed a reserve/future contract with the Steelers on January 24, 2017. He was waived by the Steelers on May 12, 2017.

References

External links
 NFL profile

Living people
1992 births
People from Wichita, Kansas
Players of American football from Kansas
American football running backs
West Virginia Mountaineers football players
San Diego Chargers players
Pittsburgh Steelers players